Casper and the Spectrals is a three-issue comic book miniseries published by Ardden Entertainment, celebrating the 60th anniversary of Casper the Friendly Ghost.

The series gives the characters a modernized look and design while living in a grittier environment. The story follows Casper as he join forces with Wendy the Good Little Witch and Hot Stuff the Little Devil to stop a monstrous threat. The issues were published from October 2009 to September 2010.

Plot
In the town of New York City, Casper and his cousin Spooky were getting lessons from their uncles the Ghostly Trio: Fusso, Lazo, and Fatso as they demonstrate by scaring a local family on the subway. Casper couldn't seem to understand why, so in a school of Spookytown, the Trio informed him that they must keep the scares in Ghostburg intact in order to keep the monstrous Volbragg contained. Casper assumed that he is just a myth, so the Trio explained to him and Spooky the origin of Willem George Volbragg, a power-hungry mad politician in the 1600s who wanted to rule New Amsterdam and terrorize the townspeople, but the townspeople had him sunk in into the bottom of the river, leaving him for dead. Volbragg ended up in Spookytown and decided to take it over instead which gives him this massive power by a witch that was able to use the magic spells to collect the scares in Spookytown that is converted into an energy source in order to make him bigger and more power and would destroy any race that has the least scares. This led the more intelligent ghosts and witches, to capture Volbragg and used his scare power to collect into prison and must channel the scare energy to keep him contained.

Meanwhile, Casper decided to fly around Spookytown thinking to see if there is another way to keep Volbragg contained rather than just scaring others. He wanders around town looking at other groups in Spookytown. He stumbled upon a group of witches who were terrorizing citizens, where a young little witch girl interfered, as she is not pleased with her aunts scaring others for their amusement, even though they explained to her that they must keep Volbragg contained. She had all the humans disappear except for one boy, whom Casper unintentionally scares off which leads the young boy back home also causing Casper to meet the young witch who thanked him for helping the boy get home. The witch was named Wendy and seeing how similar she is to him, Casper befriends her, and they spend most of the time hanging out, learning about one another.

One day in Deviland, they encounter a trouble-making young devil name Hot Stuff who pulled a prank on the ogres and has Casper and Wendy take the blame, where the ogres have captured them in a net that even with their powers they can't be able to fade through. Hot Stuff decided to save them by pretending to be a mud monster and demanded the ogres to let them go and entrapped them with the net. After Casper, Wendy and Hot Stuff escape the ogres, Casper and Wendy offer Hot Stuff to join them which he reluctantly agreed to since he can relate to the idea of not being wanted. With Hot Stuff as their new friend, Casper and Wendy decided to show Hot Stuff around teaching him how to be nice as Hot Stuff shows the two of his race of demons. The three encounter a werewolf, who threatens to eat Hot Stuff. Although Casper tries to save him, by scaring the werewolf, the werewolf wasn't intimated by him and finds his attempt to scare him amusing.

The three escape and went into their hideout where they were caught and punished by their elders for hanging out with each other; therefore, they were forbidden to see each other again. Meanwhile, scientists attempted to learn about the other world, and collect its energy source, but the machine they used was taking away their energy and lets loose ghosts, ghouls, and goblins terrorizing their world and weakening the prison's hold that contained Volbragg which woke him up and went on a rampage to rule all of Spookytown. Casper, Wendy, and Hot Stuff reunited and witness the chaos as the many ghosts and ghouls were running from the monstrous beast. Casper believed that he is lonely and all he wanted was to be accepted, but Wendy and Hot Stuff think that he has lost his mind, which led to a huge argument between Casper and Wendy ultimately ending their friendship as Hot Stuff was left all alone. Hot Stuff ran into the scientists who told him what had happened and tried to stop it, but they can't. Hot Stuff flew off to find Casper and Wendy. Meanwhile, Wendy finds the witch that gave Volbragg the magic spells who then, in turn, gives Wendy her old wand that can take Volbragg's magic away. Casper went up to Volbragg thinking that he can try to reason with him, but is interrupted by Hot Stuff and Wendy which give Volbragg the impression that Casper was setting him up.

The three went into the scientist's lab as it was revealed that Volbragg was getting his energy from the electricity from the human world. With that being said, Casper insists on using dampening dust the professor gave him to cope with Volbragg while Wendy would use the wand the witch gave her to take Volbragg, but Volbragg has proven to be too powerful for Casper until Hot Stuff used balloons covered in white sheets that had faces on it in which he used to pull the prank on the ogres, to distract Volbragg, as he was losing power and energy which gives Wendy the opportunity to use the wand against him. It turns out that Volbragg has the power of being a part ghost, part witch, part devil as Wendy has to say three phrases three times to use the magic and take away his powers. Just as a huge brick was about to fall onto her, Hot Stuff pushed her out of the way to save her, giving him the self-sacrifice by getting knocked over by the brick instead.

Later, everyone in Spookytown moaned for Hot Stuff's apparent death, but it was revealed by his parents that the only way to bring him back to life is by dumping him in the fire. He rose up from the fire with everyone cheering that he is alive and they all congratulated Casper, Wendy, and Hot Stuff on defeating Volbragg giving Hot Stuff the idea of having a party to celebrate, as it was the friendship of the three that band together in defeating Volbragg.

Characters

Main Characters
 Casper – a ghost who instead of scaring others like all the other ghosts, he wants to be friendly around other people. He befriends Wendy and Hot Stuff as they band together to defeat Volbragg.
 Wendy – a good little witch girl whom like Casper, doesn't like to use her power for terrorizing others, but wants to use it for good. She befriends Casper and Hot Stuff seeing that she can easily relate to them. With her magic spells, she used it in an effort to defeat Volbragg.
 Hot Stuff – a devil who is the more trouble making of the three, but when he befriended Casper and Wendy he became nicer and more helpful when the others needed him.

Supporting Characters
 The Ghostly Trio - Casper and Spooky's uncles and teachers who always resent their nephew's nice attitude, and are willing to keep all the scares just to keep Volbragg contain in his prison.
 Spooky - Casper's cousin who is the exact opposite in that he admires scaring other people.
 Wendy's aunts - like the Ghostly Trio Wendy's aunts admires scaring people, but also trying to keep Volbragg from getting out.
 Hot Stuff's family - a family of devils that consists of Hot Stuff's mother, father, and older brother.
 Professor Phinieas Field - a scientist who intends on collecting energy from other worlds, but accidentally causes a probe between Spookytown and the Human World as well as Volbragg's release from prison.
 Eloise "Ellie" Essex - Professor Field's intern and lab assistant.

Antagonists
 Willem George Volbragg - the main antagonist of the miniseries. He is a power hungry mad politician who intends to take over New Amsterdam. When that fails, he seeks his intentions on Spookytown by collecting all the scares to become more powerful and feared, but his scare collect was used as a prison in order to keep him contained.

References

American comics titles
2009 comics debuts
Casper the Friendly Ghost